Ntshingwayo Dam (previously known as Chelmsford Dam) is a combined gravity and arch type dam located on the Ingagane River in South Africa. It was established in 1961 and serves mainly for municipal and industrial use. The hazard potential of the dam has been ranked high (3). The dam is enclosed in the Chelmsford Nature Reserve.

See also
List of reservoirs and dams in South Africa

References 

 List of South African Dams from the Department of Water Affairs

Dams in South Africa
Dams completed in 1961